Andy Donnelly (born 1 May 1943) is a Scottish former professional footballer who played as a goalkeeper.

Career
Born in Lanark, Donnelly played for Coltness United, Clyde, Millwall, Weymouth, Torquay United and Cape Town City.

References

1943 births
Living people
Scottish footballers
Newmains United Community F.C. players
Clyde F.C. players
Millwall F.C. players
Weymouth F.C. players
Torquay United F.C. players
Cape Town City F.C. (NFL) players
English Football League players
Association football goalkeepers
Scottish expatriate footballers
Scottish expatriate sportspeople in South Africa
Expatriate soccer players in South Africa
Sportspeople from Lanark
National Football League (South Africa) players
Footballers from South Lanarkshire